Michel Roche (8 September 1939 – 11 June 2004) was an equestrian from France and Olympic champion. He won a gold medal in show jumping with the French team at the 1976 Summer Olympics in Montreal.

References

1939 births
2004 deaths
French male equestrians
Olympic equestrians of France
Olympic gold medalists for France
Equestrians at the 1976 Summer Olympics
Olympic medalists in equestrian
Medalists at the 1976 Summer Olympics